Mirko Puzović (born April 24, 1956 in Аranđelovac, Serbia) is a retired boxer from Yugoslavia. At the 1984 Summer Olympics he won the bronze medal in the men's light welterweight division (– 63.5 kg). In the semifinals he was beaten by eventual winner Jerry Page of the United States. He did the same two years earlier at the World Championships in Munich, West Germany.

Olympic results
1st round bye
Defeated Denis Lambert (Canada) 5–0
Defeated Steve Larrimore (Bahamas) 5–0
Defeated Jean Mbereke (Cameroon) 5–0
Lost to Jerry Page (United States) 0–5

External links
 databaseOlympics.com

1956 births
Living people
Serbian male boxers
Light-welterweight boxers
Olympic boxers of Yugoslavia
Boxers at the 1984 Summer Olympics
Olympic bronze medalists for Yugoslavia
Olympic medalists in boxing
Yugoslav male boxers
AIBA World Boxing Championships medalists
Medalists at the 1984 Summer Olympics
Mediterranean Games silver medalists for Yugoslavia
Mediterranean Games medalists in boxing
Competitors at the 1983 Mediterranean Games